Trichoderma stromaticum is a species of fungus in the family Hypocreaceae. It is a parasite of the cacao witches broom pathogen and has been used in its biological control.

References

External links
 
 

Trichoderma
Biopesticides
Biotechnology
Biological pest control
Fungi described in 2000